Josh Griffiths is the name of:

Josh Griffiths (Casualty), fictional character
Josh Griffiths (Jiu Jitsu practitioner), American martial artist
Josh Griffiths (runner), Welsh runner
Josh Griffiths (footballer), English footballer